Zhongguan could refer to the following towns in China:

 Zhongguan, Guizhou (中观), in Zheng'an County, Guizhou
 Zhongguan, Hebei (中关), in Longhua County, Hebei
 Zhongguan, Jiangxi (中馆), in Duchang County, Jiangxi
 Zhongguan, Zhejiang (钟管), in Deqing County, Zhejiang

See also
Zhongguancun, a neighborhood and technology hub in Haidian District, Beijing, China